Victor Alfred Samson (4 March 1892 – 5 April 1990) was  a former Australian rules footballer who played with Footscray in the Victorian Football League (VFL).

Notes

External links 

1892 births
1990 deaths
Australian rules footballers from Melbourne
Australian Rules footballers: place kick exponents
Footscray Football Club (VFA) players
Western Bulldogs players
People from Williamstown, Victoria